Yacht Club Games, LLC is an American independent video game development studio and publisher founded in 2011 by former WayForward Technologies director Sean Velasco. The company announced their first title, Shovel Knight, on March 14, 2013, and released it on June 26, 2014, after a successful Kickstarter campaign. In 2016, the company announced that it would start publishing games from other companies, and that their first published game would be  Azure Striker Gunvolt: Striker Pack, a compilation containing Azure Striker Gunvolt and Azure Striker Gunvolt 2, which was released later that year. Their second published title was Cyber Shadow, a game developed by Mechanical Head Studios, which was released in 2021. In February 2022, the company announced their second original title, Mina the Hollower.

List of games developed

List of games published

Notes

References

External links

 
American companies established in 2011
Video game companies established in 2011
Video game companies of the United States
Video game development companies
Video game publishers
Companies based in Los Angeles
2011 establishments in California